The 2014 Birmingham City Council election took place on 22 May 2014 to elect members of Birmingham City Council in England. This was on the same day as other local elections.

All results are compared to 2010 as that is the term which expired in 2014.

Result

Results by ward

Acocks Green

Aston

Bartley Green

Billesley

Bordesley Green

Bournville

Edgbaston

Erdington

Hall Green

Handsworth Wood

Harborne

Hodge Hill

Kings Norton

Kingstanding

Ladywood

Longbridge

N.B. Cruise left the Labour Party in August 2015 and now sits as an Independent.

Lozells and East Handsworth

Moseley and Kings Heath

Nechells

Northfield

Oscott

Perry Barr

Quinton

Selly Oak

Shard End

Sheldon

Soho

South Yardley

Sparkbrook

Springfield

Stechford and Yardley North

Stockland Green

Sutton Four Oaks

Sutton New Hall

Sutton Trinity

Sutton Vesey

Tyburn

Washwood Heath

Weoley

References

2014 English local elections
2014
2010s in Birmingham, West Midlands